Adolf Michel (born 12 February 1878, date of death unknown) was an Austrian sport shooter who competed in the 1912 Summer Olympics.

Michel was born in Vienna.

In 1912, he was a member of the Austrian team which finished fourth in the team 100 metre running deer, single shots competition. In the 100 metre running deer, single shots event, he finished tenth.

References

External links
 

1878 births
Year of death missing
Austrian male sport shooters
Running target shooters
Olympic shooters of Austria
Shooters at the 1912 Summer Olympics
Sportspeople from the Austro-Hungarian Empire